Moaning Caverns is a solutional cave located in the Calaveras County, California, near Vallecito, California in the heart of the state's Gold Country. It is developed in marble of the Calaveras Formation. It was discovered in modern times by gold miners in 1851, but it has long been known as an interesting geological feature by prehistoric peoples. It gets its name from the moaning sound that echoed out of the cave luring people to the entrance, however expansion of the opening to allow access for the public disrupted the sounds.
The portion of the cave developed for tourists consists of a spacious vertical shaft 165 feet tall, which is descended by a combination of stairs and a unique  spiral staircase built in the early 1900s. It is open to the public for walking tours and spelunking. Including the off-trail areas, the cave reaches a depth of 410 feet (124 m).

Human remains
Moaning Caverns is also an archaeological site. According to archaeologist Phil C. Orr, these human deposits were about 12,000 years old, for they were under 420 mm. of speleothem mineral deposits. Nevertheless, there are also many other human bones in these caves, some of them from the more recent periods.

Phil C. Orr also discovered the important Arlington Springs Man remains that are now considered authentic.

There was a lot of controversy about these and other remains in the caves. For example, the Calaveras Skull, found in the same area was deemed to be a hoax.

The cave has long been the resting spot for the bodies of prehistoric people who fell into its opening.

The main chamber
Moaning Caverns is home to the largest single cave chamber open to the public in California. The massive room reaches over 180 feet before funneling into smaller passageways. With a 20–30 foot thick ceiling, the open area inside the chamber is, in fact, tall enough to hold the Statue of Liberty (pedestal excluded). There are two natural entrances into the chamber. One, in the form of a 45-feet vertical chimney dropping into the center of the room, was discovered during the Gold Rush in the early 1850s. The secondary entrance is a narrow crack in the earth which was enlarged to permit commercial entry into the cavern beginning in 1920. The narrow wooden staircase ends at a flat platform 65 feet underground. From there, a ten-story spiral staircase leads down to a second platform at the base of the chamber.

Tourism in the cavern
The large chamber of Moaning Caverns draws large numbers of guests every year to see the beauty of the cave. Access to the cavern is permitted by guided tour only, entering the cavern at scheduled times via a secondary passageway discovered in 1920. The original main entrance is still visible at the start of the tour, but is no longer used to access the cavern. Rappelling into the cavern via the original entrance was an activity offered between 1984 and 2017, but is no longer available.

Expedition Tour
The main chamber extends the first one-third of the cave's total depth. The Expedition Tour covers a portion of the passageways below. It requires crawling on hands and knees, and even stretching out to lie flat and wiggle, for several hours.

On The Surface

Moaning Caverns also had surface activities such as a zip line and rock climbing wall, but as of 2019 these activities are no longer available. Please visit their current website, https://moaningcaverns.com/ , as the only source of up-to-date activity offerings at their location.

Notes

External links
 Showcaves info page
 Moaning Caverns Tours

Caves of California
Landforms of Calaveras County, California
Limestone caves
Show caves in the United States
Tourist attractions in Calaveras County, California
Oldest human remains in the Americas